Tula is the largest city and the administrative center of Tula Oblast in Russia, located  south of Moscow. Tula is located in the northern Central Russian Upland on the banks of the Upa River, a tributary of the Oka. At the 2010 census, Tula had a population of 501,169, an increase from 481,216 in 2002, making it the 32nd largest city in Russia by population.

A primarily industrial city, Tula was a fortress at the border of the Principality of Ryazan. The city was seized by Ivan Bolotnikov during the Time of Troubles and withstood a four-month siege by the Tsar's army. Historically, Tula was a major centre for the manufacture of armaments. The Demidov family built the first armament factory in Russia in the city, in what would become the Tula Arms Plant, which still operates to this day.

Tula is home to the Klokovo air base, Tula State University, Tula Kremlin, The Tula State Museum of Weapons and Kazanskaya embankment of the Upa River. Tula has a historical association with the samovar, a metal container used to heat and boil water; the city was a major center of Russian samovar production. Additionally, Tula is known for its imprinted gingerbread (pryanik), which has been made in Tula since the 17th century.

Etymology
The name of the city is likely  pre-Russian, probably of Baltic origin.

History

Tula was first mentioned in the Nikon Chronicle (year 1146).

In the Middle Ages, Tula was a minor fortress at the border of the Principality of Ryazan. As soon as it passed to the Grand Duchy of Moscow, a brick citadel, or kremlin, was constructed in 1514–1521. It was a key fortress of the Great Abatis Belt and successfully resisted a siege by the Tatars in 1552. In 1607, Ivan Bolotnikov and his supporters seized the citadel and withstood a four-months siege by the Tsar's army. In the 18th century, some parts of the kremlin walls were demolished. Despite its archaic appearance, the five-domed Assumption Cathedral in the kremlin was built as late as 1764.

In 1712, Tula was visited by Peter the Great, who commissioned the Demidov blacksmiths to build the first armament factory in Russia. Several decades later, Tula was turned by the Demidovs into the greatest ironworking center of Eastern Europe. The oldest museum in the city, showcasing the history of weapons, was inaugurated by the Demidovs in 1724, and Nicholas-Zaretsky Church in the city houses their family vault. The first factory to produce samovars industrially was also established there in the course of the 18th century. After the Demidovs moved the center of their manufacture to the Urals, Tula continued as a center of heavy industry, particularly in the manufacture of matériel.

In the 1890s, Ivan Savelyev, a medical orderly, became the founder of social democracy in Tula and set up a workers' study circle.

During World War II, the city was important in the production of armaments. Tula became the target of a German offensive to break Soviet resistance in the Moscow area between Friday, 24 October and 5 December 1941. According to Erik Durschmied in The Weather Factor: How Nature has Changed History, one German general reached the southwestern outskirts of Tula on 29-30 October 1941. 
 

The heavily fortified city held out, however, and Guderian's Second Panzer Army was stopped near Tula. The city secured the southern flank during the Battle of Moscow and the subsequent counter-offensive. Tula was awarded the title Hero City in 1976. It is home to the Klokovo air base and the Tula Arms Plant.

Administrative and municipal status
Tula serves as the administrative center of the oblast. Within the framework of administrative divisions, it is incorporated as Tula City Under Oblast Jurisdiction—an administrative unit with the status equal to that of the districts. As a municipal division, the territories of Tula City Under Oblast Jurisdiction and of Leninsky District are incorporated as Tula Urban Okrug.

Mayors
 Sergey Kazakov (1997–2005)
 Vladimir Mogilnikov (2005–2010)
 Alisa Tolkachyova (2010–2011)
 Yevgeny Avilov (2011–2012)
 Aleksandr Prokopuk (2012–2014)
 Yuri Tskipuri (2014–2019)
 Olga Slyusareva (2019-present time)

Economy
For more than four centuries Tula has been known as a center of crafts and metalworking. Tula is a developed industrial center. Importance in the industrial structure of Tula are metallurgy, machinery and metal with a high share of the military-industrial complex and food manufacturing.

Armaments industry
Almaz-Antey Concern: Scientific Production Association Strela (Russian: ОАО НПО «Стрела»)
Splav (Russian: ОАО НПО «СПЛАВ») part of the Techmash holding  of Rostec; only manufacturer of multiple rocket launchers in Russia: BM-21 Grad, BM-27 Uragan, BM-30 Smerch
KBP Instrument Design Bureau
Shcheglovsky Val plant (Russian: «Щегловский вал» завод): manufacturer of the Bumerang-BM for the T-15 Armata
Tactical Missiles Corporation: TsKBA (Russian: ОАО «ЦКБА»)
Tula Arms Plant
Tulamashzavod
Tula Cartridge Plant

Other companies
Shtamp Machine-Building Plant
Oktava
Yasnaya Polyana: a confectionery factory established in 1973 under the holding of United Confectioners (Russian: Холдинг «Объединенные кондитеры») that produces 340 different candies including "Yasnaya Polyana"

Culture

A musical instrument, the Tula accordion, is named after the city, which is a center of manufacture for such instruments sold throughout Russia and the world. Tula is also renowned for traditional Russian pryanik, cookies made with honey and spices (see Tula pryanik). In the West, Tula is perhaps best known as the center of arms manufacturing, mainly by TT pistol, as well as samovar production: the Russian equivalent of "coals to Newcastle" is "You don't take a samovar to Tula". (The saying is falsely ascribed to the writer and playwright Anton Chekhov, whose made a satirical portrait of one of his characters saying "Taking your wife to Paris is the same as taking your own samovar to Tula".)

The most popular tourist attraction in Tula Oblast is Yasnaya Polyana, the home and burial place of the writer Leo Tolstoy. It was here that Tolstoy wrote his celebrated novels War and Peace and Anna Karenina. The largest public park in Tula is the P. Belousov Central Park of Culture and Recreation.

Education
Tula is home to:
Tula State University
Tula State Pedagogical University
The Tula artillery and Engineering Institute
A branch of All Russia Economic and Finance Institute
A branch of Moscow Economics and Management Institute

Transportation
Since 1867, there has been a railway connection between Tula and Moscow. Tula is a major railway junction with trains to Moscow, Oryol, Kursk and Kaluga. The Moscow to Simferopol M2 motorway runs past the city. City transport is provided by trams, trolleybuses, buses, and marshrutkas. Tula trams, trolleybuses, and bus routes are operated by "Tulgorelectrotrans" (Tula city electrotransport company). Klokovo (air base) of the Russian Air Force is located nearby.

Religion
Most of Tula's churches are Russian Orthodox churches. Next in number are Protestants and Catholics. Non-Christian organizations that are present include Muslims, Jews, Hare Krishna, Buddhists and Taoists.

All Orthodox organizations in  Tula and the Tula Oblast are included in the Diocese of Tula and Yefremov. Among the Tula Orthodox churches should be mentioned Saints Cathedral (1776-1800), the oldest church in Tula - Annunciation (1692) and the Assumption Cathedral of the Tula Kremlin (1762-1764). There is also the Shcheglovsky Monastery of Holy Mother of God, built in mid 19th century and consecrated in 1860. In Tula also Old Believers' community services which are performed in the church of St. John Chrysostom.  

In Tula there is the only Catholic church in the area, the Holy Apostles Peter and Paul. Since the 1990s, Tula has several Protestant denominations, the largest church of which is a Baptist church with a prayer house in Tula. Representatives of other Protestant churches in Tula are Seventh-day Adventists, Presbyterians (Church of the Holy Trinity, The Glorious Jesus the Lord, the Good News), Pentecostals (Tula Christian Center, Church of the New Testament) and other evangelical churches (Word of Life, the Vine Gypsy Church).

Also the city has a synagogue and the Jewish Community House.

Sports
In Russian fist fighting, Tula was considered to have some of the most famous fighters.

The city association football club, FC Arsenal Tula, played in the Russian Premier League in 2014/2015 and 2016/2017 seasons.

People

Arts
Leo Tolstoy (1828-1910), Writer
Leonid Bobylev (born 1949), composer
German Galynin (1922–1966), composer 
Vladimir Mashkov (born 1963), theater and film actor and director
Vyacheslav Nevinny (1934–2009), theater and film actor
Maria Ouspenskaya (1876–1949), actress and acting teacher
Vsevolod Sanayev (1912–1996), theater and film actor, acting teacher
Sofia Sotnichevskaya (1916–2011), actress
Irina Skobtseva (1927–2020), actress
Gleb Uspensky (1843–1901), writer
Vikenty Veresaev (1867–1945), writer
Alexey Vorobyov (born 1988), singer, actor and model
Alexey Goloborodko (born 1994), dance contortionist

Public services
 Vyacheslav Dudka (born 1960), governor of Tula Oblast (2005–2011)
 Vladimir Ivanov (1893–1938), Soviet politician
 Yury Afonin, politician
 Viktor Ilyich Baranov, Soviet Army lieutenant general
Ivan Bakhtin, governor of the Kharkov Governorate

Sciences, technologies
Nikolay Artemov (1908–2005) physiologist
Vladimir Bazarov (1874–1939), philosopher and economist
Vasily Degtyaryov (1880–1949), weapons engineer
Valery Legasov (1936–1988), inorganic chemist
Valery Polyakov (1942-2022), cosmonaut
Ivan Sakharov (1807–1863), folklorist, ethnographer
Petr Sushkin (1868–1928), ornithologist
Sergei Tokarev (1899–1985), historian, ethnographer

Sports
Ksenia Afanasyeva (born 1991), Olympic artistic gymnast, world and European champion
Evgeniya Augustinas (born 1988), racing cyclist, European champion
Ekaterina Gnidenko (born 1992), track cyclist
Yevgeny Grishin (1931–2005), speedskater, Olympic and European champion
Oksana Grishina (born 1968), track cyclist
Irina Kirillova (born 1965), volleyball player, Olympic, world and European champion
Sergei Kopylov (born 1960), racing cyclist
Alexander Kotov (1913–1981), chess player, international grandmaster, SSSR champion, author, mechanical engineer
Viktor Kudriavtsev (born 1937), figure skating coach
Andrey Kuznetsov (born 1991), tennis player
Vladimir Leonov (born 1937), cyclist
Valentina Maksimova (born 1937), track cyclist 
Ihor Nadein (1948–2014), football player and coach
Nikolay Novikov, (born 15 May 1946), boxer
Alexandra Obolentseva (born 2001), chess player
Yelena Posevina (born 1986), rhythmic gymnast, Olympic, world and European champion
Anastasia Voynova (born 1993), racing cyclist, world and European champion

Others
 Nikita Demidov (1656–1725), industrialist, founder of Demidov dynasty

Climate
Tula has a humid continental climate. This is pronounced by warm summers and cold but not severe winters by Russian standards.

Twin towns – sister cities

Tula is twinned with:

 Albany, United States
 Barranquilla, Colombia
 Kerch, Ukraine/Crimea 
 Mogilev, Belarus
 Villingen-Schwenningen, Germany

References

Notes

Sources

Further reading

External links

Map: Battle of Tula 1941

 
Tulsky Uyezd
Populated places established in the 2nd millennium